Lone Wolf is a town in Kiowa County, Oklahoma, United States. The population was 438 at the 2010 census, a decline of 12.4 percent from 500 in 2000. The town was named for Chief Lone Wolf (1843–1923), a warrior chief of the Kiowa who fought to preserve his people's autonomy and way of life.

History
The town of Lone Wolf was founded in August 1901, on the opening of the Kiowa-Comanche-Apache Reservation to settlement. It was located along the Chicago, Rock Island and Pacific Railroad. The population was 307 at the time of statehood in 1907. From its inception, Lone Wolf's economy  has been supported by agriculture, specifically wheat farms nearby.

Geography

Lake Altus-Lugert is about 6 miles southwest.

Climate

Demographics

As of the census of 2000, there were 500 people, 222 households, and 148 families residing in the town. There were 263 housing units at an average density of 506.3 per square mile (195.3/km2). The racial makeup of the town was 91.20% White, 0.60% African American, 3.80% Native American, 1.60% from other races, and 2.80% from two or more races. Hispanic or Latino of any race were 4.80% of the population.

There were 222 households, out of which 27.9% had children under the age of 18 living with them, 50.5% were married couples living together, 12.6% had a female householder with no husband present, and 32.9% were non-families. 30.6% of all households were made up of individuals, and 14.4% had someone living alone who was 65 years of age or older. The average household size was 2.25 and the average family size was 2.78.

In the town, the population was spread out, with 24.4% under the age of 18, 9.0% from 18 to 24, 24.6% from 25 to 44, 23.2% from 45 to 64, and 18.8% who were 65 years of age or older. The median age was 40 years. For every 100 females, there were 89.4 males. For every 100 females age 18 and over, there were 84.4 males.

The median income for a household in the town was $24,808, and the median income for a family was $32,000. Males had a median income of $25,972 versus $21,750 for females. The per capita income for the town was $13,525. About 15.4% of families and 20.6% of the population were below the poverty line, including 24.2% of those under age 18 and 15.9% of those age 65 or over.

According to Veselin Traykov's study of Bulgarian emigration to North America, there was a Roman Catholic Banat Bulgarian settlement in Lone Wolf, established mainly through immigration from Romania in the 1920s and 1930s, with the Banat Bulgarians engaging primarily in farming.

Sources

References

Towns in Kiowa County, Oklahoma
Towns in Oklahoma
American people of Bulgarian descent
Banat Bulgarian people